This is a list of famous people from Bergen, Norway.

Artists and actors

 Johan Christian Dahl (1788–1857), painter.
 Helge Jordal (1946–) actor 
 Elly Kjølstad (1850–1930), actress
 Frank Krog (1954–2008), actor 
 Bjarte Hjelmeland (1970–) actor
 Vegard Ylvisåker (1979–) & Bård Ylvisåker (1982–) comedians, musicians, talk show hosts 
 Kygo (1991–) Kyrre Gørvell-Dahll, DJ, record producer 
 Alan Walker (1997–) producer 
 KREAM (brothers Daniel and Markus Slettebakken) record producers
 Daniel Simonsen, comedian, actor

Authors

 Dorothe Engelbretsdotter (1634–1713) author. 
 Ludvig Holberg (1684–1754), playwright.
 Johan Sebastian Welhaven (1807–1873) author, poet. 
 Amalie Skram (1846–1905) author 
 Arnulf Øverland (1889–1968) author 
 Carl Søyland (1894–1978) Norwegian American editor-in-chief of Nordisk Tidende 
 Nordahl Grieg (1902–1943) poet, author 
 Torborg Nedreaas (1906–1987) author and winner of the Kritikerprisen
 Babbis Friis-Baastad (1921-1970) children's writer 
 Gunnar Staalesen (1947–) author

Musicians 

 Ole Bull (1810–1880), violinist, composer.
 Edvard Grieg (1843–1907), composer, pianist. 
 Harald Sæverud (1897–1992), composer 
 Jan Eggum (1951–) singer-songwriter 
 Truls Mørk (1961–) cellist  
 Sissel Kyrkjebø (1969–) singer 
 Magnet (musician) (1970–) musician 
 Roger Tiegs (1972–) musician: Gorgoroth 
 Olve Eikemo (1973–) musician: Immortal 
 Varg Vikernes (1973–) musician 
 Tom Cato Visnes (1974–) musician: God Seed/Gorgororth
 Kristian Espedal (1975–) musician: God Seed/Gorgororth
 Erlend Øye (1975–) musician
 Eirik Glambek Bøe (1975–) musician
 Kurt Nilsen (1978-) musician, singer-songwriter
 Anne Lilia Berge Strand (1978–) musician
 Einar Selvik (1979-) musician: Gorgoroth/Wardruna
 Sondre Lerche (1982–) musician
 Lars Vaular (1984–) rapper
 Christine Guldbrandsen (1985–) singer
 Marthe Wang (1990-) singer-songwriter
 Aurora Aksnes (1996–) singer, songwriter
 Sigrid (1996–) singer-songwriter

Scientists

 Gerhard Armauer Hansen (1841–1912) leprosy researcher 
 Leonhard Hess Stejneger (1851–1943) ornithologist, herpetologist and zoologist 
 Hans Henrik Reusch (1852–1922) a geologist, geomorphologist and educator.
 Reidar Fauske Sognnaes (1911–1984),  Dean of the Harvard University School of Dental Medicine
 Ivar Giaever (born 1929) Nobel Prize in Physics laureate in 1973

Politicians

 Trond Torleivsson Benkestok (1490–1558) nobleman 
 Georg Wallace (1804-1890) elected to the Storting in 1850 for Bergen
 Christian Wilhelm Wisbech (1832–1897) elected to parliament in 1883 and 1889
 Christian Michelsen (1857–1925) ship owner, Prime Minister of Norway
 Albert Viljam Hagelin (1881–1946) politician for the Nasjonal Samling 
 Ingvald B. Aase (1882–1948) trade unionist and politician for the Labour and Communist parties 
 Carl Joachim Hambro (1885–1964) politician, President of Parliament 
 Erna Solberg (1961- ) 28th Prime Minister of Norway
 Marte Mjøs Persen (1975- ), member of the Cabinet of Norway

Sport

 Roald Jensen (1943–1987) football player 
 Terje Hauge (1965–) football referee
 Arne Sandstø (1966-) football manager
 Mia Hundvin (1977-) handballer
 Erik Huseklepp (1984–) football player
 Alexander Dale Oen (1985–2012) swimmer 
 Magnus Midtbø (1988-) climber
 Jakob Glesnes (1994-) football player
 Renate Blindheim (1994-) football manager
 Gustav Iden (1996-) triathlete

Others
 Ulrik Vilhelm Koren (1826–1910)  Norwegian-American Lutheran church leader
 Tryggve Gran (1889–1980) aviator
 Leif Andreas Larsen (1906–1990) naval officer 
 Max Manus (1914–1981) decorated resistance-fighter
 Terje Rød-Larsen (1947–) diplomat, sociologist 
 Peter Sunde (1978–) entrepreneur, The Pirate Bay 
 El Rubius (1990–) Rubén Gundersen, YouTube personality, the 49th most subscribed on YouTube

References

 
Bergen
Bergen